OnlyOneOf (온리원오브) is a South Korean boy band formed by 8D Entertainment in 2019. The group debuted on May 28, 2019, with Dot Point Jump.

History

2019: Debut with Dot Point Jump and first comeback Line Sun Goodness
On May 1, 8D Creative announced the debut of a seven-member group called OnlyOneOf, which stands for "someone's only one". The style pursued by the group was described as "ubersexual," indicating a mix of softness and strong masculine sexiness. The members trained for three years, coming up with songs, stage composition, costumes and concepts themselves for the weekly evaluations.

It was revealed on May 24 that the group would debut four days later with two title tracks, "Savanna" and "Time Leap", as part of a mini album titled Dot Point Jump. Only the two songs were released on that day along with the music videos, while the other four tracks were revealed sequentially for each 5,555 use of the hashtag "#OnlyOneOf" on Twitter. Members KB, Love and Nine participated in writing and composing two songs. "Savanna" was considered a viral YouTube hit, gaining more than 10 million views in five months.

As part of the promotions of their first EP, the group performed on music shows for seven weeks, held a 4-hour fansigning event, and worked as baristas in Seoul, Busan and Gwangju. Starting October 1, they released the 8-part reality show OnlyOneOf Love Unlock through Mnet and M2.

On October 4, the first teaser for their second mini album Line Sun Goodness was uploaded to YouTube, announcing that their first comeback would take place in the same month. A week later, the individual teaser photo for Yoojung was released, revealing the album would be released on October 30. Due to technical difficulties, the music video for the title track "Sage" was not released until three days later, on November 2. The song explores, both in the lyrics and through the visuals of the music video, temptation and redemption, and the mythology and characters behind OnlyOneOf's concept, which has been developed by creative director and producer Jaden Jeong over three years taking inspiration from religion and the Bible. KB, Love and Nine once again wrote lyrics, music, and arrangements for three out of six tracks.

Following the release of their second EP, OnlyOneOf toured Malaysia from November 22 to November 24.

2020: Unknown Art Pop 2.1 and Produced by [ ] series
On January 30, OnlyOneOf released the single album Unknown Art Pop 2.1, featuring the songs "Dora Maar" and "Picasso," which talk about the relationship between Pablo Picasso and Dora Maar from two different perspectives. At the same time, they launched a contest for participants to write English lyrics for "Dora Maar", with the winner receiving a cash prize of $100,000, as well as having their version released as the official international version at a later date. Praising their "avant-guarde approach," Billboard named them one of the K-pop rookie groups to watch in 2020.

On April 30, it was announced that OnlyOneOf would launch the Produced by [ ] series, which would act as a parenthesis among the group's regular releases: the first one, Produced by [ ] Part 1, was produced by Gray, Boycold, and Cha Cha Malone. The three-track single album was released on May 21 along with the title track "Angel", an EDM and hip-hop song by Gray, who declared he had wanted to collaborate with OnlyOneOf for the traditional K-pop atmosphere and elegant vibe of their music.

The second single album, Produced by [ ] Part 2, featured three songs by GroovyRoom, Samuel Seo, and JR Groove: it was released on August 27 with the title track "A Song of Ice & Fire", which was based on the omonymous novel series by George R. R. Martin. Compared to the first installment of the series, Produced by [ ] Part 2 presented more melodic than hip-hop music.

2021: Instinct Part.1, Produced by [Myself], and Love's departure
On April 8, 2021, OnlyOneOf released their third mini album Instinct Part. 1 with the title track "Libido", a song about sexual instinct and impulses that saw KB and Nine participating in composition and arrangement. The group explained that it had always been debated whether the topic was art or obscenity, and that they wanted to break a taboo never dealt with by other groups. Overall, the whole album explores the theme of instinct, and deals with the sexy concept Jaden Jeong had in mind when OnlyOneOf was created.

The members touching each others' bodies and using strings in the choreography caused a controversy for being too suggestive as soon as they performed "Libido" on M Countdown on April 9, to which OnlyOneOf responded that it emphasized the theme of the music and that they hoped the public could focus on the overall aesthetic and expressive power. Instinct Part. 1 recorded the highest daily sales for the group since debut – 27,926 copies according to the Hanteo Chart and 25,872 copies for the Gaon Chart – and exceeded 50,000 as of April 14. On the same day, OnlyOneOf released the Guilty Pleasure version of the "Libido" music video. At the end of the year, "Libido" was chosen as the best Korean music video of 2021 by Rolling Stone India for breaking boundaries and representing the LGBTQ+ community.

In May, KB, Love and Rie sang "Into You" for the webseries The Sweet Blood. On July 15, OnlyOneOf released their third single album Produced by [Myself], whose songs were entirely self-written and self-composed by the members.

On August 2, Love withdrew from the group due to personal reasons.

On September 10, the group unexpectedly released the single album Unknown Ballad 2.3, containing the song "Mono" written and composed by Nine. Another single album, WarmWinterWishes, was released on December 23.

2022: Japanese debut, Instinct Part. 2 and Underground Idol
On January 12, 2022, OnlyOneOf made their Japanese debut with the compilation album OnlyOneOf Japan Best Album, which comprises the Japanese version of "Angel" and the hybrid Korean-Japanese versions of five previous released songs.

On January 14, the group released its fourth extended play Instinct Part. 2 with the title track "Skinz", which stresses the importance of individuality and being yourself. On May 2, they held the OnlyOneOf Japan Live 2022 at the Zepp DiverCity Tokyo, their first performance in Japan, in front of 3,000 people; it was followed by the release of the Japanese single album Suit Dance (Japanese ver.) on May 18, which ranked fifth on the Oricon Weekly Singles Chart.

In the second half of the year the members embarked in the Underground Idol project, which saw them release a solo song each every month, accompanied by an "art pop" remix of one of the group's songs. The first member was Yoojung, who released "Begin" and its music video on June 27. He was followed by KB with "Be Free" on July 27, and Junji with "Be Mine" on August 25. In the meantime, they performed at the 2022 G-Kpop Concert on July 15.

After a pause for the group's second Japanese single album Cunning Woman (ズルい女) – a remake of the 1995 song by Sharam Q – and a three-stop tour in Japan at the beginning of October for the OnlyOneOf 2nd Japan Live 2022, the Underground Idol project continued: on October 27, Rie released "Because", followed by Mill on November 28 with "Beat". On November 11, it was announced that OnlyOneOf had all been cast in the gay webseries Bump Up Business.

On January 4, 2023, the Underground Idol project ended with Nine's release, the single "Beyond". Overall, the project was appreciated for showcasing OnlyOneOf's abilities in singing, composition, arrangement, and acting.

2023: Seoul Collection and American Tour 
On March 2, 2023, OnlyOneOf released their first Korean extended play as a group after one year, Seoul Collection. The album tells the stories of young people hurt by others wandering in Seoul; Nine and KB participated in writing, composing and arranging the seven songs.

The group will embark on the OnlyOneOf Grand America Tour from March 31. Of the 16 stops, seven went sold out as soon as ticketing opened at the beginning of January 2023.

Members 
KB (규빈)
Rie (리에)
Yoojung (유정)
Junji (준지)
Mill (밀)
Nine (나인)

Past members 
Love (러브) (2019–2021)

Discography

Compilation albums

Extended plays

Single albums

Singles

Filmography

Web series

References

K-pop music groups
South Korean boy bands
South Korean dance music groups
Musical groups from Seoul
Musical groups established in 2019
2019 establishments in South Korea
South Korean pop music groups